Kennerly is a surname and also a given name. Notable people with the surname include:

Caleb Burwell Rowan Kennerly (1830–1861), American surgeon-naturalist
David Hume Kennerly (born 1947), Pulitzer Prize–winning photographer
David Ethan Kennerly, Role-playing game author
Paul Kennerly (born 1948), English singer-songwriter, musician, and record producer
Robert Wilson Kennerly (born 1931), US-politician and community leader
Thomas Martin Kennerly (1874–1962), United States federal judge

Notable people with Kennerly as a first name include:
Kennerly Kitt, Musician, actress, and one of The Harp Twins

Alternative spellings of Kennerly exist, such as Kenerly and Kenerley. Some spell it with an "i", e.g. Kinerly. 
Kennerly is often confused with the surname Kennedy.

Kennerley families have been important in the founding of America.

References